Giovanna Volpato (born August 20, 1975 in Mestre) is a female long-distance runner from Italy who specializes in the marathon.

Biography
She finished twelfth at the 2002 European Athletics Championships and eighth at the 2006 European Athletics Championships, the latter in a personal best time of 2:32:04 hours.

Achievements

See also
 Italian all-time top lists - Marathon

References

External links
 

1975 births
Living people
Italian female long-distance runners
Italian female marathon runners
World Athletics Championships athletes for Italy
20th-century Italian women
21st-century Italian women